The BFI Future Film Festival is a United Kingdom film festival for young filmmakers (16-25 year-olds), organised by the British Film Institute. Founded in 2008, it takes place over a weekend in February each year, and focuses equally on fiction, animation and documentary.

The festival provides emerging filmmakers and "young people who love watching films" with masterclasses, workshops, film screenings from emerging filmmakers and Q&A sessions, all at BFI Southbank in London. The festival is not just for filmmakers.

Before the second year of the festival, the BBC's Creative Director, Alan Yentob, said: "It's going to give young people a fantastic opportunity to get involved in something creative and possibly life-changing. Who knows, we may even be able to spot a couple of BAFTA winners of the future." While The Guardian noted that the "festival is aimed at nurturing young film-makers, and there's plenty for them to be inspired by". Later, in 2017, the BFI Film Academy alumni and the Future Film Lab Award winner Charlotte Regan's short film "Standby" was nominated for BAFTA

In 2017, the festival's panel included producer Rebecca O'Brien and cinematographer Ben Davis for the workshop on cinematography  and Joe Wicks for Social Media Masterclass. The first screening of the web-series 'Reality' directed by Nathan Bryon was also during the festival.

The festival is part of a wider BFI Future Film program which also include a number of other different events aiming to support and help young filmmakers to learn more about the industry:
 BFI Future Film Academy 
 Future Film Labs
 Free Screenings + Q&A sessions
 Future Film Recommends screenings

Awards

12th Future Film Festival (2019)
 Best International Short (sponsored by The London School of English) - Departures by Nicolas Morganti Patrignani
 Best International New Talent - Dulce Hogar (Sweet Tooth by Giovana Olmos) 
 New Talent Awards - The Grey Area (Katie Clark), Agya (Curtis Essel), John Ogunmuyiwa (Wilson), Dorothy Allen-Pickard (The Mess)
 Black Dog Production Award for Best Non-Narrative Film - As Is by Alice Bloomfield
 Best 16-18 UK Short Film - The Milk Bottle by Saul Lotzof
 Best 19-25 UK Short Film - Henceforth by Charlene Jones
 Future Film Lab Award - Alex Deitsch

11th Future Film Festival (2018)
Best Experimental Short Award — Dead. Tissue. Love (Natasha Austin-Green)
Hiive Audience Award — False Men (Christopher Chuky)
BFI Patron’s New Talent Awards - Amygdala (George Graham), Beneath the Surface (Yero Timi-Biu), V (Ellie Gocher), The Fence (Rashida Seriki)
International New Talent Award - The Voyager (João Gonzalez)
The Best International Short Award — Local Monuments (Sebastián Martínez Valdivia)
Best 16-18 UK Short — Father | Daughter (Oskar Nilsson)
Best 19-25 UK Short — Calling Home (Jade Jackman)
Future Film Lab Award sponsored by Lacie — The Fence (Rashida Seriki)

10th Future Film Festival (2017)
 Best Experimental Short - One Diving, One Falling by Harry Cauty
 New Talent Awards - Emma Changes the Lock by Julia Hart, Addy by Matty Crawford, Run by Thea Gajic
 Best International Short (sponsored by The London School of English/London School Trust) - Miriam by Sarah Lederman
 Best 16-18 UK Short Film - Lux by Issy Snailham
 Best 19-25 UK Short Film - Fish Story by Charlie Lyne
 Future Film Lab Award - Standby by Charlotte Regan and Jack Hannon
 Hiive Audience Award - Venus by Fay Carr-Wilson

9th Future Film Festival (2016)
 Best Experimental Short - Power to the Mini Beasts by Ella Bee Glendining and Florence Watson
 Best Micro Short - Stalkers by Fred Tilby-Jones
 Best International Short - Horseface by Marc Martínez Jordán
 Best 16-18 UK Short Film - You Know That Feeling by Emily Llewllyn
 Best 19-25 UK Short Film - Isabella by Duncan Cowles, Ross Hogg
 Best Writer – I'm Good With Plants by Thomas Harnett Omeara
 Best Producer – Slow Down by Megan K. Fox
 Best Director – She Would Move the Tree Rather More to the Middle by Anna Maguire

See also

 BFI London Film Festival
 BFI Flare: London LGBT Film Festival

References

External links

 

British Film Institute
Film festivals in London
2008 establishments in the United Kingdom
Short film festivals in the United Kingdom